Intervenor compensation is a practice in which community representatives and public advocates are compensated by the state for their involvement in regulatory procedures of public interest. Intervenor compensation programs have been suggested or enacted in several American states, such as California, Hawaii, Maine, Virginia and Wisconsin.

References 

Workers' compensation